Shalim (Šalām, Shalem, Salem, and Salim) is a god in Canaanite religion, mentioned in inscriptions found in Ugarit (Ras Shamra) in Syria. William F. Albright identified Shalim as the god of dusk and Shahar as god of the dawn. In the Dictionary of Deities and Demons in the Bible, Shalim is also identified as the deity representing Venus or the "Evening Star" and Shahar the "Morning Star". His name derives from the triconsonantal Semitic root Š-L-M ("whole, safe, peace").

Ugaritic inscriptions
An Ugaritic myth known as The Gracious and Most Beautiful Gods, describes Shalim and his brother Shahar as offspring of El through two women he meets at the seashore. They are both nursed by "The Lady", likely Asherah (Athirat or Anat), and have appetites as large as "(one) lip to the earth and (one) lip to the heaven." In other Ugaritic texts, the two are associated with the sun goddess.

Another inscription is a sentence repeated three times in a para-mythological text, "Let me invoke the gracious gods, the voracious gods of ym." Ym in most Semitic languages means "day," and Shalim and Shahar, twin deities of the dusk and dawn, were conceived of as its beginning and end.

Shalim is also mentioned separately in the Ugaritic god lists and forms of his name also appear in personal names, perhaps as a divine name or epithet.

Many scholars believe that the name of Shalim is preserved in the name of the city Jerusalem. The god Shalim may have been associated with dusk and the evening star in the etymological senses of a "completion" of the day, "sunset" and "peace".

References

Bibliography

Children of El (deity)
Night gods
Phoenician mythology
Stellar gods
Ugaritic deities
Venusian deities
West Semitic gods